A Twenty20 International (T20I) is a form of cricket, played between two of the international members of the International Cricket Council (ICC), in which each team faces a maximum of twenty overs. The matches have top-class status and are the highest T20 standard. The game is played under the rules of Twenty20 cricket. The first Twenty20 International match between two men's sides was played on 17 February 2005, involving Australia and New Zealand. Wisden Cricketers' Almanack reported that "neither side took the game especially seriously", and it was noted by ESPNcricinfo that but for a large score for Ricky Ponting, "the concept would have shuddered". However, Ponting himself said "if it does become an international game then I'm sure the novelty won't be there all the time".
This is a list of Bangladesh Cricket team's Twenty20 International records. It is based on the List of Twenty20 International records, but concentrates solely on records dealing with the Bangladeshi cricket team. Bangladesh played the first ever T20I in 2006.

Key
The top five records are listed for each category, except for the team wins, losses, draws and ties, all round records and the partnership records. Tied records for fifth place are also included. Explanations of the general symbols and cricketing terms used in the list are given below. Specific details are provided in each category where appropriate. All records include matches played for Bangladesh only, and are correct .

Team records

Overall Record

Team wins, losses, draws and ties 
, Bangladesh has played 124 T20I matches resulting in 44 victories, 78 defeats, 0 ties, and 2 no results for an overall winning percentage of 34.95

First bilateral T20I series wins

First T20I match wins

Team scoring records

Most runs in an innings
The highest innings total scored in T20Is has been scored twice. The first occasion came in the match between Afghanistan and Ireland when Afghanistan scored 278/3 in the 2nd T20I of the Ireland series in India in February 2019. The Czech Republic against Turkey during the 2019 Continental Cup scored 278/4 to equal the record. The highest score for Bangladesh is 215/5 scored against Sri Lanka during the 2018 Nidahas Trophy.

Fewest runs in an innings
The lowest innings total scored was by Turkey against Czech Republic when they were dismissed for 21 during the 2019 Continental Cup. The lowest score in T20I history for Bangladesh is 70 scored against New Zealand in the 2016 ICC World Twenty20.

Most runs conceded an innings
The second match of the Bangladesh's tour of South Africa in October 2017 saw Bangladesh concede their highest innings total of 224/4.

Fewest runs conceded in an innings
The lowest score conceded by Bangladesh for a full inning is 60 when they dismissed New Zealand in the first T20I of the 2021 T20I Series at the Sher-e-Bangla National Cricket Stadium, Mirpur, Bangladesh.

Most runs aggregate in a match
The highest match aggregate scored in T20Is came in the match between India and West Indies in the first T20I of the August 2016 series at Central Broward Regional Park, Lauderhill when India scored 244/4 in response to West Indies score of 245/6 to loose the match by 1 run. The third match of the 2018 Nidahas Trophy against Sri Lanka saw a total of 429 runs being scored, the most involving Bangladesh.

Fewest runs aggregate in a match
The lowest match aggregate in T20Is is 57 when Turkey were dismissed for 28 by Luxembourg in the second T20I of the 2019 Continental Cup in Romania in August 2019. The lowest match aggregate in T20I history for Bangladesh is 150 scored during the 2014 ICC World Twenty20 game against Afghanistan at the Sher-e-Bangla National Cricket Stadium, Mirpur, Bangladesh.

Result records
A T20I match is won when one side has scored more runs than the runs scored by the opposing side during their innings. If both sides have completed both their allocated innings and the side that fielded last has the higher aggregate of runs, it is known as a win by runs. This indicates the number of runs that they had scored more than the opposing side. If the side batting last wins the match, it is known as a win by wickets, indicating the number of wickets that were still to fall.

Greatest win margins (by runs)
The greatest winning margin by runs in T20Is was Czech Republic's victory over Turkey by 257 runs in the sixth match of the 2019 Continental Cup. The largest victory recorded by Bangladesh was during the Bangladesh's tour of Ireland Lanka in 2012 by 71 runs.

Greatest win margins (by balls remaining)
The greatest winning margin by balls remaining in T20Is was Austria's victory over Turkey by 104 balls remaining in the ninth match of the 2019 Continental Cup. The largest victory recorded by Bangladesh is during the 2014 ICC World Twenty20 against Afghanistan when they won by 9 wickets with 48 balls remaining.

Greatest win margins (by wickets)
A total of 22 matches have ended with chasing team winning by 10 wickets with New Zealand winning by such margins a record three times. Bangladesh have not won a T20I match by this margin yet.

Highest successful run chases
Australia holds the record for the highest successful run chase which they achieved when they scored 245/5 in response to New Zealand's 243/6. Bangladesh's highest innings total while chasing is 215/5 in a successful run chase against Sri Lanka at Colombo (RPS), Sri Lanka during the 2018 Nidahas Trophy.

Narrowest win margins (by runs)
The narrowest run margin victory is by 1 run which has been achieved in 15 T20I's with Bangladesh winning such games once.

Narrowest win margins (by balls remaining)
The narrowest winning margin by balls remaining in T20Is is by winning of the last ball which has been achieved 26 times. Bangladesh has achieve victory of the last ball once.

Narrowest win margins (by wickets)
The narrowest margin of victory by wickets is 1 wicket which has settled four such T20Is. The narrowest victory by wickets for Bangladesh is two wickets achieved on two occasions.

Greatest loss margins (by runs)
Bangladesh's biggest defeat by runs was against Pakistan in the 2008 tour of Pakistan at National Stadium, Karachi, Pakistan.

Greatest loss margins (by balls remaining)
The largest defeat suffered by Bangladesh was against New Zealand in New Zealand during the 2010 T20I Series when they lost by 10 wickets with 70 balls remaining.

Greatest loss margins (by wickets)
Bangladesh have lost a T20I match by a margin of 10 wickets on one occasion.

Narrowest loss margins (by runs)
The narrowest loss of Bangladesh in terms of runs is by 1 run suffered twice.

Narrowest loss margins (by balls remaining)
Bangladesh has suffered loss off the last ball thrice.

Narrowest loss margins (by wickets)
Bangladesh has suffered defeat by 1 wicket once.

Individual records

Batting records

Most career runs
A run is the basic means of scoring in cricket.
India's Virat Kohli has scored the most runs in T20Is with 2,794. Second is Rohit Sharma of India with 2,773 ahead of Martin Guptill from New Zealand in third with 2,536. Shakib Al Hasan is the leading Bangladeshi batsmen on this list.

Most runs in each batting position

Highest individual score
The third T20I of the 2018 Zimbabwe Tri-Nation Series saw Aaron Finch score the highest Individual score. Tamim Iqbal holds the Bangladeshi record with his century against Oman during the 2016 ICC World Twenty20

Highest individual score – progression of record

Highest score against each opponent

Highest career average
A batsman's batting average is the total number of runs they have scored divided by the number of times they have been dismissed.

Highest Average in each batting position

Most half-centuries
A half-century is a score of between 50 and 99 runs. Statistically, once a batsman's score reaches 100, it is no longer considered a half-century but a century.

Virat Kohli of India has scored the most half-centuries in T20Is with 24. He is followed by India's Rohit Sharma on 21, Ireland's Paul Stirling on 18 and Australia's David Warner on 17. Shakib Al Hasan has the most half-centuries for Bangladesh.

Most centuries
A century is a score of 100 or more runs in a single innings.

Rohit Sharma has scored the most centuries in T20Is with 4. Tamim Iqbal has scored the only century for Bangladesh.

Most Sixes

Most Fours

Highest strike rates
Ravija Sandaruwan of Kuwait holds the record for highest strike rate, with minimum 250 balls faced qualification, with 165.80. Mashrafe Mortaza is the Bangladeshi with the highest strike rate.

Highest strike rates in an inning
Dwayne Smith of West Indies strike rate of 414.28 during his 29 off 7 balls against Bangladesh during 2007 ICC World Twenty20 is the world record for highest strike rate in an innings. Aftab Ahmed with his innings of 36 off 14 balls against South Africa in September 2018 during the 2007 ICC World Twenty20 holds the top position for a Bangladesh player in this list.

Most runs in a calendar year
Paul Stirling of Ireland holds the record for most runs scored in a calendar year with 748 runs scored in 2019. Sabbir Rahman scored 463 runs in 2016, the most for a Bangladesh batsmen in a year.

Most runs in a series
The 2014 ICC World Twenty20 in Bangladesh saw Virat Kohli set the record for the most runs scored in a single series scoring 319 runs. He is followed by Tillakaratne Dilshan with 317 runs scored in the 2009 ICC World Twenty20. Tamim Iqbal has scored the most runs in a series for a Bangladesh batsmen, when he scored 295 runs in the 2016 ICC World Twenty20.

Most ducks
A duck refers to a batsman being dismissed without scoring a run. 
Tillakaratne Dilshan of Sri Lanka, Pakistan's Umar Akmal and Ireland's Kevin O'Brien has scored the equal highest number of ducks in T20Is with 10 such knocks. Soumy Sarkar with 8 ducks has the highest number of such knocks for Bangladesh.

Bowling records

Most career wickets
A bowler takes the wicket of a batsman when the form of dismissal is bowled, caught, leg before wicket, stumped or hit wicket. If the batsman is dismissed by run out, obstructing the field, handling the ball, hitting the ball twice or timed out the bowler does not receive credit.

Shakib Al Hasan of Bangladesh is the highest wicket-taker in T20Is. He is the also highest ranked Bangladeshi bowler on the all-time.

Best figures in an innings
Bowling figures refers to the number of the wickets a bowler has taken and the number of runs conceded.
India's Deepak Chahar holds the world record for best figures in an innings when he took 6/7 against Bangladesh in November 2019 at Nagpur. Elias Sunny holds the Bangladeshi record for best bowling figures.

Best figures in an innings – progression of record

Best Bowling Figure against each opponent

Best career average
A bowler's bowling average is the total number of runs they have conceded divided by the number of wickets they have taken.
Afghanistan's Rashid Khan holds the record for the best career average in T20Is with 12.62. Ajantha Mendis, Sri Lankan cricketer, is second behind Rashid with an overall career average of 14.42 runs per wicket. Al-Amin Hossain with an average of 16.98 is the highest ranked Bangladeshi bowler.

Best career economy rate
A bowler's economy rate is the total number of runs they have conceded divided by the number of overs they have bowled.
New Zealand's Daniel Vettori, holds the T20I record for the best career economy rate with 5.70. Shakib Al Hasan is the highest ranked Bangladeshi on the list.

Best career strike rate
A bowler's strike rate is the total number of balls they have bowled divided by the number of wickets they have taken.
The top bowler with the best T20I career strike rate is Rashid Khan of Afghanistan with strike rate of 12.3 balls per wicket. Al-Amin Hossain is the Bangladeshi bowler with the lowest strike rate.

Most four-wickets (& over) hauls in an innings
Pakistan's Umar Gul has taken the most four-wickets (or over) among all the bowlers. Shakib Al Hasan has taken most such hauls for Bangladesh.

Best economy rates in an inning
The best economy rate in an inning, when a minimum of 12 balls are delivered by the bowler, is Sri Lankan player Nuwan Kulasekara economy of 0.00 during his spell of 0 runs for 1 wicket in 2 overs against Netherlands at Zohur Ahmed Chowdhury Stadium in the 2014 ICC World Twenty20. Mahmudullah holds the Bangladeshi record during his spell in 2014 ICC World Twenty20 at Mirpur, Bangladesh.

Best strike rates in an inning
The best strike rate in an inning, when a minimum of 4 wickets are taken by the player, is by Steve Tikolo of Kenya during his spell of 4/2 in 1.2 overs against Scotland during the 2013 ICC World Twenty20 Qualifier at ICC Academy, Dubai, UAE. Shakib Al Hasan, Abdur Razzak and Mustafizur Rahman have the best strike rate among Bangladeshi bowlers.

Worst figures in an innings
The worst figures in a T20I came in the Sri Lanka's tour of Australia when Kasun Rajitha of Sri Lanka had figures of 0/75 off his four overs at Adelaide Oval, Adelaide. The worst figures by a Bangladeshi is 0/63 that came off the bowling of Mashrafe Mortaza in the 2014 ICC World Twenty20 at Sher-e-Bangla National Cricket Stadium, Mirpur, Bangladesh.

Most runs conceded in a match
Kasun Rajitha also holds the dubious distinction of most runs conceded in a T20I during the aforementioned match. Mortaza in the above-mentioned spell and Rubel Hossain with figures of 2/63 off his four overs against West Indies in December 2012 hold the most runs conceded distinction for Bangladesh.

Most wickets in a calendar year
Australia's Andrew Tye holds the record for most wickets taken in a year when he took 31 wickets in 2018 in 19 T20Is. Al-Amin Hossain with 22 wickets in 2016 is the leading Bangladeshi bowler on this list.

Most wickets in a series
2019 ICC World Twenty20 Qualifier at UAE saw records set for the most wickets taken by a bowler in a T20I series when Oman's pacer Bilal Khan tool 18 wickets during the series. Al-Amin Hossain in the 2016 Asia Cup took 11 wickets, the most for a Bangladeshi bowler in a series.

Wicket-keeping records
The wicket-keeper is a specialist fielder who stands behind the stumps being guarded by the batsman on strike and is the only member of the fielding side allowed to wear gloves and leg pads.

Most career dismissals
A wicket-keeper can be credited with the dismissal of a batsman in two ways, caught or stumped. A fair catch is taken when the ball is caught fully within the field of play without it bouncing after the ball has touched the striker's bat or glove holding the bat, Laws 5.6.2.2 and 5.6.2.3 state that the hand or the glove holding the bat shall be regarded as the ball striking or touching the bat while a stumping occurs when the wicket-keeper puts down the wicket while the batsman is out of his ground and not attempting a run.
Mushfiqur Rahim is the highest ranked Bangladeshi wicket keeper in the all-time list of taking most dismissals in T20Is as a designated wicket-keeper, which is headed by India's MS Dhoni and West Indian Denesh Ramdin.

Most career catches
Rahim has taken the most catches in T20Is as a designated wicket-keeper with Dhoni and Ramdin leading the all-time list.

Most career stumpings
Carey has made the most stumpings in T20Is as a designated wicket-keeper among Bangladeshi with Dhoni and Kamran Akmal of Pakistan heading this all-time list.

Most dismissals in an innings
Four wicket-keepers on four occasions have taken five dismissals in a single innings in a T20I.

The feat of taking 4 dismissals in an innings has been achieved by 19 wicket-keepers on 26 occasions.

Most dismissals in a series
Netherlands wicket-keeper Scott edwards holds the T20Is record for the most dismissals taken by a wicket-keeper in a series. He made 13 dismissals during the 2019 ICC World Twenty20 Qualifier. Bangladeshi record is held by Rahim when he made 7 dismissals during the 2007 ICC World Twenty20.

Fielding records

Most career catches
Caught is one of the nine methods a batsman can be dismissed in cricket. The majority of catches are caught in the slips, located behind the batsman, next to the wicket-keeper, on the off side of the field. Most slip fielders are top order batsmen.

South Africa's David Miller holds the record for the most catches in T20Is by a non-wicket-keeper with 57, followed by Shoaib Malik of Pakistan on 50 and New Zealand's Martin Guptill with 47. Mahmudullah is the leading catcher for Bangladesh.

Most catches in an innings
The feat of taking 4 catches in an innings has been achieved by 14 fielders on 14 occasions. No Bangladeshi fielder has achieved this feat. The most is three catches on seven occasions.

Most catches in a series
The 2019 ICC Men's T20 World Cup Qualifier, which saw Netherlands retain their title, saw the record set for the most catches taken by a non-wicket-keeper in a T20I series. Jersey's Ben Stevens and Namibia's JJ Smit took 10 catches in the series. Soumya Sarkar during the 2016 Asia Cup and Sabbir Rahman during the 2018 Nidahas Trophy are the leading Bangladeshi filder on this list with 6 catches each.

Other records

Most career matches
Pakistan's Shoaib Malik holds the record for the most T20I matches played with 113, followed by Rohit Sharma of India with 108 and Ross Taylor of New Zealand with 100 games. Mahmadullah is the most experienced Bangladeshi player having represented the team on 100 occasions.

Most consecutive career matches
Afghanistan's Mohammad Shahzad and Asghar Afghan hold the record for the most consecutive T20I matches played with 58. Mahmudullah holds the Bangladeshi record.

Most matches as captain
MS Dhoni, who led the Indian cricket team from 2007 to 2016, holds the record for the most matches played as captain in T20Is with 72. Mashrafe Mortaza has led Bangladesh in 28 matches, the most for any player from his country.

Youngest players on Debut
The youngest player to play in a T20I match is Marian Gherasim at the age of 14 years and 16 days. Making his debut for Romania against the Bulgaria on 16 October 2020 in the first T20I of the 2020 Balkan Cup thus becoming the youngest to play in a men's T20I match.

Oldest Players on Debut
The Turkish batsmen Osman Göker is the oldest player to make their debut a T20I match. Playing in the 2019 Continental Cup against Romania at Moara Vlasiei Cricket Ground, Moara Vlăsiei he was aged 59 years and 181 days.

Oldest Players
The Turkish batsmen Osman Göker is the oldest player to appear in a T20I match during the same above mentioned match.

Partnership records
In cricket, two batsmen are always present at the crease batting together in a partnership. This partnership will continue until one of them is dismissed, retires or the innings comes to a close.

Highest partnerships by wicket
A wicket partnership describes the number of runs scored before each wicket falls. The first wicket partnership is between the opening batsmen and continues until the first wicket falls. The second wicket partnership then commences between the not out batsman and the number three batsman. This partnership continues until the second wicket falls. The third wicket partnership then commences between the not out batsman and the new batsman. This continues down to the tenth wicket partnership. When the tenth wicket has fallen, there is no batsman left to partner so the innings is closed.

Highest partnerships by runs
The highest T20I partnership by runs for any wicket is held by the Afghan pairing of Hazratullah Zazai and Usman Ghani who put together an opening wicket partnership of 236 runs during the Ireland v Afghanistan series in India in 2019

Highest overall partnership runs by a pair

Umpiring records

Most matches umpired
An umpire in cricket is a person who officiates the match according to the Laws of Cricket. Two umpires adjudicate the match on the field, whilst a third umpire has access to video replays, and a fourth umpire looks after the match balls and other duties. The records below are only for on-field umpires.

Ahsan Raza of Pakistan holds the record for the most T20I matches umpired with 49. The most experienced Bangladeshi umpire is Sharfuddoula with 31 matches officiated so far.

See also

List of Bangladesh Test cricket records
List of Bangladesh One Day International cricket records
List of Twenty20 International records
List of Test cricket records
List of Cricket World Cup records

Notes

References

Lists of Bangladesh cricket records and statistics
Bangladesh in international cricket
Bangladesh
Bangladeshi cricket lists